Sir Alexander Maitland, 1st Baronet (21 March 1728 – 15 February 1820) was a general in the British Army and the first of the Maitland baronets of Clifton.  He was the fifth son of Charles Maitland, 6th Earl of Lauderdale.

Maitland's promotions were as follows:
Colonel - 19 February 1762
Major-General - 25 May 1772
Lieutenant-General - 29 August 1777
General - 12 October 1793

He was Colonel of the 49th Regiment of Foot from 1768 to 1820, a total of 52 years.

Maitland was made Baronet of Clifton in the County of Midlothian, in the Baronetage of the United Kingdom, on 30 November 1818.

He died on 15 February 1820 and is buried at St Andrew's church, Totteridge, in north London. A memorial plaque inside the church remembers him and other members of his family.

|-

References

1728 births
1820 deaths
British Army generals
Baronets in the Baronetage of the United Kingdom
St Andrew's church, Totteridge
49th Regiment of Foot officers
Younger sons of earls
Grenadier Guards officers